BR Verkehr ( formerly : BR Traffic News ) is a 24-hour DAB program owned and operated by the Bayerischer Rundfunk (BR) and a high-tech speech synthesis program for informing car, truck and bus drivers and other road users about the traffic. Such programs are also referred to as announcement programs. The system is also used by WDR under the name VERA .

Program  
BR Verkehr sends as offer of the Bayerischer Rundfunk over the DAB + net. The program consists almost entirely of traffic information received by the BR traffic department from police, ADAC or other media. All traffic information and messages are given to a so-called speech synthesis system. The result is a female computer-generated voice that reads out the messages and info. An active moderation does not take place.

The BR also transmits traffic data in other radio waves in TPEG format ( Transport Protocol Experts Group format, a further development of the common TMC system).

Reception 
The channel can be received in the DAB + network of the Bayerischer Rundfunk in Volume III, which currently covers large parts of Bavaria and is still under construction. The transmitters are operated in a common wave network on channel 11D. From 1 September 2005 to 9 January 2012, BR Verkehr was also available via DVB-S in the ARD Digital program package throughout Europe. The German cable providers also fed the station digitally into the cable network until 9 January 2012.

It is also possible to call up the complete traffic information by calling 01805/333066.

On 9 January 2012 the distribution of BR traffic via DVB-S and DVB-C was switched off. Since then, it can be read on the former broadcasting space of BR Verkehr in the EPG that the station is now distributed exclusively via DAB +.

References

Radio stations in Germany
Radio stations established in 2003
2003 establishments in Germany
Mass media in Munich
Bayerischer Rundfunk